Defending champion Billie Jean King defeated Kerry Melville in the final, 6–3, 7–5 to win the women's singles tennis title at the 1972 US Open.

Seeds
The seeded players are listed below. Billie Jean King is the champion; others show the round in which they were eliminated.

 Billie Jean King (champion)
 Evonne Goolagong (third round)
 Chris Evert (semifinalist)
 Rosie Casals (quarterfinalist)
 Margaret Court (semifinalist)
 Nancy Richey Gunter (first round)
 Françoise Dürr (third round)
 Virginia Wade (quarterfinalist)
 Kerry Melville (finalist)

Draw

Key
 Q = Qualifier
 WC = Wild card
 LL = Lucky loser
 r = Retired

Final eight

Earlier rounds

Section 1

Section 2

Section 3

Section 4

External links
1972 US Open – Women's draws and results at the International Tennis Federation

Women's Singles
US Open (tennis) by year – Women's singles
1972 in women's tennis
1972 in American women's sports